The 111th New York State Legislature, consisting of the New York State Senate and the New York State Assembly, met from January 3 to July 20, 1888, during the fourth year of David B. Hill's governorship, in Albany.

Background
Under the provisions of the New York Constitution of 1846, 32 Senators and 128 assemblymen were elected in single-seat districts; senators for a two-year term, assemblymen for a one-year term. The senatorial districts were made up of entire counties, except New York County (seven districts) and Kings County (three districts). The Assembly districts were made up of entire towns, or city wards, forming a contiguous area, all within the same county.

At this time there were two major political parties: the Democratic Party and the Republican Party. Three labor reform organizations nominated state tickets under the names of "United Labor", "Progressive Labor" and "Union Labor". The Prohibition Party, the Greenback Party, and a "Reform Party"  also nominated tickets.

Elections
The New York state election, 1887 was held on November 8. All five statewide elective offices up for election were carried by the Democrats. The approximate party strength at this election, as expressed by the vote for Secretary of State, was: Democrats 470,000; Republicans 453,000; United Labor 70,000; and Prohibition 42,000.

Sessions
The Legislature met for the regular session at the State Capitol in Albany on January 3, 1888; and adjourned on May 11.

Fremont Cole (R) was elected Speaker against William F. Sheehan (D).

Henry R. Low (R) was elected president pro tempore of the State Senate.

The Legislature met for a special session on July 17, and adjourned three days later. This session was called to consider the situation in the State prisons. Three laws were passed at the special session.

State Senate

Districts

Note: There are now 62 counties in the State of New York. The counties which are not mentioned in this list had not yet been established, or sufficiently organized, the area being included in one or more of the abovementioned counties.

Members
The asterisk (*) denotes members of the previous Legislature who continued in office as members of this Legislature. George F. Langbein, Jacob A. Cantor, Eugene S. Ives, Michael F. Collins, George Z. Erwin, Frank B. Arnold and William L. Sweet changed from the Assembly to the Senate.

Employees
 Clerk: John S. Kenyon
 Sergeant-at-Arms: John W. Corning
 Doorkeeper: Charles V. Schram
 Assistant Doorkeeper: Hiram Van Tassel
 Stenographer: Harris A. Corell

State Assembly

Assemblymen
The asterisk (*) denotes members of the previous Legislature who continued as members of this Legislature.

Employees
 Clerk: Charles A. Chickering
 Sergeant-at-Arms: Isaac Scott
 Doorkeeper: Homer B. Webb
 First Assistant Doorkeeper: John P. Harlow
 Second Assistant Doorkeeper: Charles H. McNaughton
 Stenographer: William Loeb, Jr.

Notes

Sources
 The New York Red Book compiled by Edgar L. Murlin (published by James B. Lyon, Albany NY, 1897; see pg. 384f for senate districts; pg. 403 for senators; pg. 410–417 for Assembly districts; and pg. 506 for assemblymen)
 Biographical sketches of the members of the Legislature in The Evening Journal Almanac (1888)
 COLE NAMED FOR SPEAKER in NYT on January 3, 1888

111
1888 in New York (state)
1888 U.S. legislative sessions